The Finishing Touch is a 1928 short comedy silent film produced by Hal Roach, directed by Clyde Bruckman and starring Laurel and Hardy. It was released February 25, 1928 by Metro-Goldwyn-Mayer.

Synopsis
Stan and Ollie are hired by a homeowner (Sam Lufkin) to finish building a house for him. Furthermore, they are offered a $500 bonus if they do a speedy job. They then proceed on their appointed task with zeal but experience one disastrous result after another. Compounding their difficulties is a nearby hospital whose small but feisty head nurse sics a policeman (Edgar Kennedy) on the finishers for being too loud in their work. The policeman tries to keep Stan and Ollie as quiet as possible. In doing so, he unwittingly gets in the firing line and suffers numerous indignities, including having a bucket of glue and a stack of shingles fall from the roof onto his head.

Eventually the home is finished, and Stan and Ollie seem to have done a passable job. The homeowner arrives. Pleased at what he sees, he gladly pays Stan and Ollie their promised $500 bonus. Moments later, however, a tiny bird lands on the house's chimney, causing the chimney to collapse and crash through the roof, which weakens the entire structure of the new house. The enraged homeowner demands his $500 back. Stan and Ollie refuse and engage in some creative teamwork to keep the $500 in their hands.

Production and exhibition
The Finishing Touch was filmed in November and December 1927. The film is a descendant of two of the duo's solo films: Laurel's Smithy (1924) and Hardy's Stick Around (1925). The paperhanger character played by Hardy in the latter film "was justly important to [Hardy], originating an embryonic form of his eventual screen character."

The Finishing Touch is set in an area undergoing real estate development in 1927; its wide open spaces provide a sense of a more pastoral Los Angeles that would soon vanish as more structures filled it in. The ill-fated structure in question here was built by the Roach construction team on Motor Avenue near the Fox studio. It was supposed to collapse completely when the duo's truck rolled through it, but an overzealous crew ignored designer Thomas Benton Roberts's design specs and made it too sturdy — so the truck lodged halfway through and ground to a stop.

The Finishing Touch was filmed on location in the neighborhood of Cheviot Hills, Los Angeles. The house under construction in the film was at 2830 Motor Avenue and was destroyed after filming. The hospital scene was filmed at 2728 McConnell Drive at a house that still stands today. Additionally, several other houses in Cheviot Hills can be seen in the background, most prominently 2839 Forrester Drive.

Script into film
L&H historian Randy Skretvedt unearthed the original action script for The Finishing Touch and discovered gags that were either unfilmed or unused in the finished picture. One gag finds Stan and Ollie in adjacent rooms: Ollie drives a nail in the wall to hang his coat on, but in the next room, the nail snags Stan's sleeve so he drives it back out. On his side of the wall, Ollie cannot figure why his coat is on the floor, but he has his suspicions; just as he steps into Stan's room to confront him, Stan has stepped into his through another door. The nail gets hammered back and forth, until it ultimately hits pay dirt — in the beleaguered hide of cop Kennedy.

The script also provided additional backstory on how the duo came to be hired to work on the house to begin with: an unfilmed scene portrayed the original construction crew having the same difficulties with the same folks from the same nearby hospital and quitting in frustration. Another change from the script was definitely an improvement: by the time the cameras rolled, the stern male physician of the script had morphed into the petite but spicy nurse played by Dorothy Coburn. Her spirited domination of both The Boys and Kennedy is made all the funnier by her gender and small stature. She makes up in spunk what she lacks in body mass — Skretvedt calls her "the quintessential tough-cookie."

The picture's finale also evolved between script and screen. In the final film, a dainty animated bird alights on the chimney, triggering a domino-effect collapse of the entire house. On the printed page, Stan himself was to be the catalyst for the implosion: he left his derby up on the roof and when he clambers up to get it, the catastrophic sequence commences. As different items tremble and fall, the homeowner takes back more of the money he has paid them, until he has taken all of it back.

Differing versions
Glenn Mitchell has noticed that The Finishing Touch is one of the few Laurel and Hardy silents with both British and American versions extant today. In the era when primitive film stocks did not permit many generations of copies to be made from a master, producers often set up multiple cameras when shooting so they would get more first-generation elements to work with — and those extra negatives often became foreign market prints. They would have slightly different angles and sometimes variations in action or cutting. Writes Mitchell:

In The Finishing Touch, this is most obvious in the close-ups of the nurse, which in the British version are presented from a different perspective and with some dissimilar facial reactions to the American equivalent. An amendment in subtitling tells us that nine years of schooling took Laurel and Hardy to the 'First Reader' for American audiences, and the 'Infants' for the British.

Today's American edition, he writes, originates from the Blackhawk Films master and combines footage from both films.

Cast
Stan Laurel as Stan
Oliver Hardy as Ollie
Ed Kennedy as The Cop
Dorothy Coburn as The Nurse
Sam Lufkin as The Homeowner

Reception
The Finishing Touch is considered a prototype film for Laurel and Hardy — the first of their "workingman" pictures, where their professional task itself becomes the backbone of the plot. Dirty Work, Busy Bodies, The Music Box and others all descend from The Finishing Touch.

The Laurel & Hardy Encyclopedia''' author Glenn Mitchell commented, "The Finishing Touch is enjoyable despite an over-reliance on slapstick. One ingenious sight gag [is when] Stan appears to be supporting both ends of a lengthy piece of timber." The Films of Laurel and Hardy author William K. Everson delivered a mixed report in 1967, saying "Considering the promise it offers, The Finishing Touch is a slight disappointment. The climactic gags lack the force and 'boff' quality that the build-up has led us to expect, and the whole short has a somewhat mechanical flavor to it. Nevertheless, it has energy, and the problems of house construction... provide every gag with anticipation as well as culmination." Janiss Garza of Allmovie said, "This two-reel Laurel and Hardy silent is especially rich in slapstick.... This silly little film doesn't have much plot to speak of, but it's so well constructed, and the humor is so solid, it doesn't matter." Laurel and Hardy: The Magic Behind the Movies  author Randy Skretvedt is more guarded in his assessment, saying, "If The Finishing Touch'' isn't as memorable as the films which preceded it, it's a pleasant enough little picture." British film critic Leslie Halliwell commented, "Excellent early star slapstick with predictable but enjoyable gags,"

References

External links 

1928 films
1928 comedy films
American silent short films
American black-and-white films
Hal Roach Studios short films
Laurel and Hardy (film series)
Metro-Goldwyn-Mayer short films
Films with screenplays by H. M. Walker
Films directed by Clyde Bruckman
1920s American films
Silent American comedy films